Aset Zhumashovich Imanbayev (also Asset Imanbayev, ; born September 23, 1981) is an amateur Kazakhstani Greco-Roman wrestler, who played for the men's featherweight category. He is a two-time Asian wrestling champion (2003 and 2004), and a gold medalist for his division at the 2002 Asian Games in Busan, South Korea.

Imanbayev represented Kazakhstan at the 2008 Summer Olympics, where he competed for the men's 55 kg class. He received a bye for the second preliminary round, before losing out to Armenia's Roman Amoyan, with a two-set technical score (1–4, 1–3), and classification point score of 1–3.

References

External links
Profile – International Wrestling Database
NBC Olympics Profile

1981 births
Living people
People from Urzhar District
Olympic wrestlers of Kazakhstan
Wrestlers at the 2008 Summer Olympics
Asian Games medalists in wrestling
Wrestlers at the 2002 Asian Games
Kazakhstani male sport wrestlers
Asian Games gold medalists for Kazakhstan
Medalists at the 2002 Asian Games
21st-century Kazakhstani people
20th-century Kazakhstani people